William Michael Ryan (22 November 1887 – 4 January 1938) was a Liberal party member of the House of Commons of Canada. He was born in Saint John, New Brunswick and became a barrister and journalist.

Ryan attended University of St. Joseph's College where he earned a Master of Arts degree, then King College Law School where he earned a Bachelor of Civil Law. He became a journalist for New Brunswick newspaper the Telegraph-Journal and Regina Leader.

He was first elected to Parliament at the St. John—Albert riding in the 1935 general election after unsuccessful campaigns there in 1926 and 1930. Ryan died in Saint John on 4 January 1938 before completing his term in the 18th Canadian Parliament, on the same day that another House of Commons member, George Perley, died.

See also
Politics of Canada

References

External links
 

1887 births
1938 deaths
Politicians from Saint John, New Brunswick
Journalists from New Brunswick
Lawyers in New Brunswick
Liberal Party of Canada MPs
Members of the House of Commons of Canada from New Brunswick